Phillip Andrew Walsh (born 4 February 1984) is an English former professional footballer. His father Alan Walsh was also a professional footballer, making over 400 appearances in the Football League.

Early life

Despite being born in Hartlepool, Walsh grew up in Portishead, North Somerset as one of four children, before moving to Turkey when his father Alan Walsh left Bristol City F.C. for Beşiktaş in 1989. The family returned to Portishead in 1991, where Walsh attended Gordano School between 1995 and 2000. After leaving school in 2000, Walsh played for Almondsbury Town.

Career

Having begun his career with Almondsbury Town, Walsh returned to the club in 2004 following spells with Clevedon Town and Taunton Town. He moved to Bath City in 2005, after impressing in a pre-season friendly win over Chesham United, where he established himself as a first team regular over a three-year period, as well as spending loan spells at Paulton Rovers and Tiverton Town. In 2008, he joined Newport County scoring one goal in nine appearances, during a 5–4 win over Dorchester Town, before moving to Tiverton Town on loan for the third time in his career, later making the move permanent for an undisclosed fee.

Walsh joined Dorchester Town in March 2009 to join up with former teammate Ashley Vickers, who had taken up a spot as the club's assistant manager. In late 2009, he joined Football League Two side Dagenham & Redbridge on trial, scoring two goals in a reserve fixture against Colchester United, before signing a permanent deal on 5 January 2010 for an undisclosed fee. He made his debut for the club on 6 February 2010 as a substitute in place of Jon Nurse during a 1–0 defeat to Northampton Town. He made a total of nine league appearances during the remainder of the season.

On 13 August 2010, Walsh joined Barnet on loan as cover for injured striker Steve Kabba. His spell was successful in a struggling side, scoring 3 League goals in 8 appearances. On 6 January 2011 Walsh joined Cheltenham Town on a month's loan. Walsh joined Hayes & Yeading United on loan in January 2012. In May 2012, Walsh was released by Dagenham due to the expiry of his contract.

Walsh signed for Ebbsfleet United in the summer of 2012.

Walsh rejoined one of his previous clubs in Bath City in February 2014.

On 21 July 2016, Walsh joined National League South side Chelmsford City from Leatherhead after a successful trial at the club.

Walsh signed for Hemel Hempstead Town in June 2017.

Personal life

Walsh is the brother-in-law of American actor Kelsey Grammer, who married his sister, Kayte Walsh, early in February 2011.

References

External links
 
 

1984 births
Living people
Footballers from Hartlepool
English footballers
Almondsbury Town A.F.C. players
Clevedon Town F.C. players
Taunton Town F.C. players
Bath City F.C. players
Paulton Rovers F.C. players
Tiverton Town F.C. players
Newport County A.F.C. players
Dorchester Town F.C. players
Dagenham & Redbridge F.C. players
Barnet F.C. players
Cheltenham Town F.C. players
Hayes & Yeading United F.C. players
Ebbsfleet United F.C. players
Leatherhead F.C. players
Chelmsford City F.C. players
English Football League players
National League (English football) players
Association football forwards
Association football defenders